PTV4 (Paikallistelevisio) was a Finnish television channel which operated from 1990 to 1997. It was originally launched on the HTV cable network (now part of DNA Welho) under the name of PTV, which was later changed to PTV4 in 1996 when it was bought by the Sanoma Group. It was the predecessor of the modern Finnish TV channel Nelonen which was launched June 1, 1997.

Programs
 Illan päätteeksi Timo T.A. (talk show hosted by Timo T. A. Mikkonen)
 Murder, She Wrote
 Paikallisuutiset (local news)
 Star Trek: The Next Generation
 Onnenportaat (a game show)
 Softa
 DuckTales
 Santa Barbara
 Mighty Morphin Power Rangers
 The Incredible Hulk
 Paalupaikka (Motorsport magazine)

Defunct television channels in Finland
1990 establishments in Finland
1997 disestablishments in Finland
Television channels and stations established in 1990
Television channels and stations disestablished in 1997